Nakajima, also transliterated as Nakashima, is the 23rd most common Japanese surname. Notable people with the surname include:

 Airi Nakajima (中島 愛里, born 1990), Japanese actress and gravure idol
 Akira Nakashima (中嶋 章, 1908–1970), Japanese electrical engineer
 Akira Nakajima (中島 章, 1923–2017), Japanese ophthalmologist
 Arisa Nakajima (中島 安里紗, born 1989), Japanese professional wrestler
 Atsushi Nakajima (中島 敦, 1909–1942), Japanese writer
 Brandon Nakashima (born 2001), American tennis player
 Chikuhei Nakajima (中島 知久平 1884–1949), Japanese aviation pioneer, founder of the Nakajima Aircraft Company
 Chris Nakashima-Brown, American science fiction author
 Daisuke Nakajima (中島 大祐, born 1989), Japanese British Formula 3 driver, younger brother of Kazuki Nakajima
 Emi Nakajima (中島 依美, born 1990), Japanese women's footballer
 George Nakashima (中島勝寿 Nakashima Katsutoshi, 1905–1990), Japanese-American woodworker, architect, and furniture maker
 Haruo Nakajima (中島 春雄, 1929-2017) Japanese actor, first person to portray Godzilla
 Hiraku Nakajima (中島 啓, born 1962), Japanese mathematician, 2003 Cole Prize winner
 Hiromi Nakashima (中島 宏海, born 1993), Japanese footballer
 Isao Nakajima (中島 功, born 1941), Japanese swimmer
 Issey Nakajima-Farran (born 1984), Canadian soccer player
 Katsuhiko Nakajima (中嶋 勝彦, born 1988), Japanese professional wrestler
 Kazuki Nakajima (中嶋 一貴, born 1985), Japanese Formula One driver, older brother of Daisuke Nakajima
 Kenichi Nakajima (中島 健一, born 1978), Japanese visual artist
 Kento Nakajima (中島健人, born 1994), Japanese actor, model and idol
 Kyoko Nakajima (中島 京子, born 1964), Japanese writer
 Makoto Nakajima (中嶋 誠, born 1952), former commissioner of the Japan Patent Office
 Masashi Nakashima (中島 勝司, born 1962), Japanese diver
 Megumi Nakajima (中島 愛, born 1989), Japanese voice actress and singer
 Mie Nakashima (中島 史恵, born 1986), Japanese field hockey player
 Mika Nakashima (中島 美嘉, born 1983), Japanese singer, model, and actress
 Miyuki Nakajima (中島 みゆき, born 1952), Japanese singer, composer, lyricist and radio personality
 Sadao Nakajima (中島貞夫, born 1934), Japanese film director
 Saki Nakajima (voice actress) (中島 沙樹, born 1978), Japanese voice actress
 Saki Nakajima (singer) (中島 早貴, born 1994), J-pop singer in the Hello! Project group °C-ute
 Satoru Nakajima (中嶋 悟, born 1953), Japanese Formula One driver and father of Kazuki Nakajima
 Shiho Nakashima (中島 志保, born 1978), Japanese snowboarder
 Shota Nakajima (born 1989), American chef
 Shoya Nakajima (中嶋 翔哉, born 1994), Japanese football player
 Takaharu Nakajima (中嶋 敬春, born 1983), Japanese speed skater
 Yoji Nakajima (born 1964), Japanese wheelchair curler, 2010 Winter Paralympian
 Yu Nakajima (中島 悠, born 1991), Japanese Rubik's Cube solver
 Yuki Nakajima (中島 由貴, born 1990), Japanese biathlete
 Yuki Nakashima (footballer) (中島 裕希, born 1984), Japanese footballer
 Yumi Nakashima (中島優美, born 1979), Japanese vocalist, guitarist and singer-songwriter
 Yuto Nakajima (中島 裕翔, born 1993), J-pop singer, actor and dancer in the group Hey! Say! JUMP
 Yuki Nakashima (中島 由貴, born 1997), Japanese voice actor, bassist from a all-girl band Roselia (band)

Fictional characters
 Characters from the "Magical Girl Lyrical Nanoha" anime series:
 Genya Nakajima, Major in command of the 108th Battalion
 Quint Nakajima
 Ginga Nakajima
 Subaru Nakajima
 "Numbers" combat cyborg characters from the "Magical Girl Lyrical Nanoha Strikers" season:
 Cinque Nakajima
 Dieci Nakajima
 Nove Nakajima
 Wendi Nakajima
 Several characters from the Strike Witches manga/anime media franchise

References

Japanese-language surnames